Ahh...Laine! is the first solo album by Wings guitarist Denny Laine, released in 1973.

Most of the music was recorded in 1972, after Laine had joined Wings.

Laine wrote and produced all the songs. On the front cover he has a Wings T-shirt, but he did perform some of these songs before joining Paul & Linda McCartney in the band. Ahh... Laine was finished up in mid-1973 and released that year. The album was given an official release on Reprise/Warner Bros. Records in 1973.

Track listing 
All songs written by Denny Laine.

Side one
 "Big Ben" (Instrumental) - 1:30  
 "Destiny Unknown" - 2:30  
 "Baby Caroline" - 4:09  
 "Don't Try, You'll Be Refused" - 1:51  
 "Talk to the Head" - 3:34  
 "Sons of Elton Haven Brown" - 4:16  
Side two
 "Find a Way Somehow" - 2:58  
 "Havin' Heaven" - 3:15  
 "On That Early Morn" - 3:36  
 "The Blues" - 2:53  
 "Everybody" - 3:11  
 "Move Me to Another Place" - 3:16

Personnel 
Denny Laine - guitars, keyboards, lead vocals
John Moorshead - guitars
Steve Thompson - bass guitar
Phobia Laob - backing vocals
Mary McCreary - backing vocals
Colin Allen - drums, percussion
Pierce Wilson - front vocals

Phoebe Snow sings uncredited on "Move Me to Another Place"

References

1973 debut albums
Denny Laine albums
Reprise Records albums